Probota Monastery is a Romanian Orthodox monastery in Probota village, Dolhasca town, Suceava County, Romania. Built in 1530, with Peter IV Rareș as ktitor, it is one of eight buildings that make up the Churches of Moldavia UNESCO World Heritage Site, and is also listed as a historic monument by the country's Ministry of Culture and Religious Affairs.

Burials
Petru Rareș

References

Churches completed in 1530
16th-century Eastern Orthodox church buildings
Buildings and structures in Suceava County
Churches of Moldavia